The following is a list of films produced in the Kannada film industry in India in 2000, presented in alphabetical order.

References

2000
Lists of 2000 films by country or language
 Kannada
2000 in Indian cinema